George Raymond Beasley-Murray (October 10, 1916 – 23 February 2000) was an evangelical Christian and prominent Baptist scholar, Principal of Spurgeon's College, London, and later Professor of New Testament Interpretation at Southern Baptist Theological Seminary.  He is known particularly for what became the standard work on Baptism in the New Testament (1962), and his major study of Jesus and the Kingdom of God (1986).  He received his D.D. from Jesus College, Cambridge.

Life 
Beasley-Murray was born in London, and studied at Spurgeon's College. He served as pastor of Ashurst Drive Baptist Church, while also studying at King's College, London. Beasley-Murray taught at the International Baptist Theological Seminary in Rüschlikon, Switzerland before becoming principal of Spurgeon's College in 1958. He served in this role until 1973, when he became James Buchanan Harrison Professor of New Testament at Southern Baptist Theological Seminary, a post he held until 1980.

In 1988, a Festschrift was published in his honour. Eschatology and the New Testament: Essays in Honor of George Raymond Beasley-Murray included contributions from R. E. Clements, James D. G. Dunn, F. F. Bruce, C. K. Barrett, Ralph P. Martin and I. Howard Marshall.

Works
n.b. selected list

References

External links
Jesus College, Cambridge obituary written by his son.

British Christian writers
1916 births
2000 deaths
British evangelicals
British biblical scholars
20th-century English Baptist ministers
Alumni of Jesus College, Cambridge
Alumni of King's College London
Alumni of the University of London
Southern Baptist Theological Seminary faculty
New Testament scholars
Bible commentators
20th-century Christian biblical scholars
Baptist biblical scholars